is a Japanese professional baseball player who is currently a free agent. He has played in Nippon Professional Baseball (NPB) for the Yokohama DeNA BayStars.

Career

On October 12, 2006, Ishikawa made his NPB debut.

On December 2, 2020, he become a free agent.

References

External links

 NPB.com

1986 births
Living people
Baseball people from Shizuoka Prefecture
Japanese baseball players
Nippon Professional Baseball infielders
Yokohama BayStars players
Yokohama DeNA BayStars players